Ice cider (also known as apple icewine or cidre de glace in French; sold as ice apple wine in the United States) is the cider equivalent of ice wine: a fermented beverage made from the juice of frozen apples. Similar to ice wine, the use of frozen apples concentrates the natural sugars in the apples, resulting in a higher alcohol content than cider made by traditional methods.

Ice cider was originally created in Quebec, made possible by the region's naturally cold temperatures. It is now also produced in other regions where the climate reaches freezing temperatures but also is suitable for apples.

History
Ice cider was first created in Quebec when Christian Barthomeuf, a winemaker from Dunham, considered the "father of ice cider", created a recipe in 1989 inspired by the ice wines of Germany. Quebec's climate is much more suited to growing apples than grapes, and the same techniques can be applied to both fruits. In 1994, at Hemmingford in Montérégie, Barthomeuf worked with Francois Pouliot to refine and develop ice cider in much larger volumes, at the cidery La Face Cachée de la Pomme.

The first bottle sold under the official designation ice cider, from La Ciderie St.-Nicholas, appeared in a Quebec government-run liquor store, the Société des alcools du Québec (SAQ) in 1999. This was also the first year the authorities allowed the use of the term ice cider, having not allowed it earlier out of concern it would be confused with traditional cider. Today, there are over 60 producers of ice cider. This has inspired producers elsewhere, and ice cider production can now be found in the Western Canada, Europe, and the United States. Expansion initially occurred in regions bordering Quebec, including the province of Ontario and the U.S. state of Vermont. In 2008, a provincial regulation by the Quebec government defined the conditions of production, and in December 2014, Quebec ice cider obtained a protected appellation (IGP), which establishes international rules and requirements on production.

The Quebec winter allows apples to freeze in a natural manner that could then be used for ice cider. However, ice cider requires four to five times as many apples as it would require to produce the same quantity of regular cider. Currently, there are around 50 producers of ice cider in Quebec. The climate requirements have made expansion of production occur slowly, but it is beginning to be produced around the world. The U.S. state of Vermont is one area in particular where cider production is increasing. The continued expansion of ice cider around the world has resulted in the industry winning a number of prizes. In 2007, La Fundacion de la Sidra in Spain awarded Christian Barthomeuf their top prize for inventing ice cider and to La Face Cachee de la Pomme for contributing to the development and commercialization in Quebec and around the world.

Production 
Ice cider can be made from two processes that concentrate the natural sugars within an apple through the use of cold temperatures: cryoconcentration and cryoextraction. The most common apples used for the production of ice cider are McIntosh, Cortland, Empire, and Spartan. Due to cryoextraction requiring the apples to remain on the branches later than they are typically picked, new breeds of apple have been developed specifically for the production of ice cider.

The process of cryoconcentration resembles slightly the process indigenous Canadians realized occurred when maple syrup could be concentrated by the cold. After letting it freeze, a piece would be broken off which would be more concentrated. The process of cryoextraction is inspired directly from the production of ice wine.

Cryoconcentration 

The most common method used (close to 95% of ice cider production) to produce ice cider involves harvesting the apples at maturity in autumn, keeping them fresh until they can be pressed in the winter. The resulting juice is then placed in containers outdoors during winter for approximately 6 months. Slowly, the water freezes and the sugar separates, and the must is harvested by gravity as the ice crystals rest on the surface due to their lower density.

Certain producers do a second cryoconcentration to increase the initial level of sugar, before fermentation. After that, at the lowest the temperature, the harvested must is fermented in vats for six to seven months before being bottled. This method gives the producer much greater control and involvement over the production process.

Cryoextraction 

In this method, frozen apples are left on the branch until the middle of winter, where they are dried out by the cold, the sun and the wind. This can require a large amount of labor on short notice and completely determined by the weather, so it is possible to harvest the apples at maturity and leave them outside until the weather is cold enough. This technique is very similar to how Amarone or straw wine is created, and is identical to the production of ice wine.

The process of decantation of the water and the juice therefore happens within the fruit rather than in the juice. The apples are then pressed, frozen more and the resulting nectar is harvested and fermented at a low temperature for around 8 months.  This method is more delicate and greatly increases the costs of production because more apples are needed to produce the same amount of cider as traditional methods. It can take 50-100 apples to make one bottle of ice cider. It is also important to note that because this method relies heavily upon the weather cooperating, in some years production is not possible if temperatures do not go low enough.

Other methods 
It is also possible to combine the two methods to make ice cider.

Definition and requirements
Ice cider has several requirements as set by the Artisan cider producers of Quebec. Drinks  must be produced by the fermentation of apple juice, which must have a concentration of sugar of 30 °Bx before fermentation in cold temperatures caused solely by the natural temperature and whose product has a residual sugar content of at least . Finally, the alcohol by volume must be more than 7% and less than 13%. In addition, these specifics must be met:

 No chaptalization;
 No addition of alcohol;
 No artificial apple juice or grape must;
 No additional flavours or colouring;
 No concentration of sugars by methods other than natural cold;
 No use of concentrated apple juice, regardless of origin, whatsoever;
 Organoleptic profile of the product corresponds to that of an ice cider as determined by a trade committee;
 The producer of ice cider cultivates the apples;
 The pressing, preparation and bottling of ice cider occur at the site of production.
The purpose of these regulations are to protect true ice cider from cheaper replicas that do not follow as rigorous a production process. In addition, the government of Quebec has expressed plans to grant a specific appellation for Quebec Ice Cider to distinguish it from ice cider produced using the same methods but outside of Quebec.

Characteristics 
Ice cider is typically served as an apéritif before a meal or along with a cheese plate or dessert after a meal. Its higher alcohol content and more expensive production process lead to it typically being sold in  bottles (half the size of a typical wine bottle), but  bottles are becoming increasingly popular. It is described as being "rich in apple flavours" but the taste can vary greatly depending on the origin of the cider and the method of production used. Cryoextraction in particular, being the more expensive of the two produces a cider with a more complex flavour, including "caramel and spice notes" among others.

See also
 Applejack (beverage)
 Dessert wine
 Fruit wine
 Ice wine
 Domaine Pinnacle

References

External links

CBC News In Depth: Nutrition — Apple icewine
Where Cider Gets a French Kick. New York Times.

Cider
Canadian alcoholic drinks
Canadian drinks
Canadian cuisine